Borov is a village in Slovakia. Now a city part of Medzilaborce, it was a separate municipality until 1971.

Villages in Slovakia
Zemplín (region)